Pterygorhabditidae is a family of nematodes belonging to the order Rhabditida.

Genera:
 Pterygorhabditis  Timm, 1957
 Pterygorhitis Andrássy, 2005

References

Nematodes